The Southern Railways (SR) is a composing part of Ukraine's Ukrzaliznytsia railroad company and is headquartered in Kharkiv. Southern Railways's route map covers all railroads of the Kharkiv, Poltava and some railroads in other oblasts (regions) as well. 

As of 2008, the Southern Railways operate  of track. The Southern Railways company contributes a large role as a transit railway in the routes of Russia-Crimea and Russia-Caucasus.

History
This regional railways was formed in 1907 soon after a merge of the Kursk-Kharkiv-Sevastopol railways and the Kharkiv-Mykolaiv railways. The company traces its history to the Kursk-Kharkiv-Azov railways that was established in 1869.

Structure

Subdivisions
 Sumy
 Kharkiv
 Poltava
 Kupiansk

Others
 Central House of Science and Technology (Kharkiv subdivision)
 Mykola Hohol Sanatorium

Directors

Southern Railways
 1907–1907 Johann-Theodore "Fyodor" Schmidt
 1907–1908 Viktor Rozanov
 1909–1910 Ippolit Ivanovskiy
 1910–1913 Vladislav Stulginskiy
 1913–1916 Boris Voskresenskiy
 1916–1917 Boris Yazykov
 1920–1920 Aleksei Ivanov (commissar)
 1920–1921 A.Hlavatskyi
 1921–1922 V.Nauman
 1923–1926 A.Ivanov
 1920s I.Myronov
 1927–1928 Viktor Paniashvili
 1928–1930 P.Bandura
 1931–1933 Yakiv Livshyts
 1933–1934 Mykola Levchenko
 1934–1934 Oleksiy Zorin

Southern Railway
 1934–1937 Petro Shushkov
 1937–1938 Ilarion Maliy
 1938–1944 Semen Kutafin
 1944–1945 Kostiantyn Danylenko
 1945–1954 Petro Dmytryuk
 1954–1959 Kostiantyn Kozhukhar
 1959–1972 Hryhoriy Holovchenko
 1972–1976 Mykola Konaryev
 1976–1983 Oleksiy Shutov
 1983–1995 Oleksandr Puchko
 1995–1997 Oleh Kryuchkov
 1997–2000 Vasyl Nesvit
 2000–2005 Viktor Ostapchuk
 2005–2005 Hryhoriy Boiko
 2005–2012 Viktor Ostapchuk
 2012–2014 Oleksandr Filatov
 2014– Mykola Umanets

External links
 Ukrzalznytsia official site

 
1520 mm gauge railways in Ukraine
Railway companies of Ukraine
Companies based in Kharkiv
Rail transport in Kharkiv